This article discusses the legendary tribe of the Curetes. For the dancing attendants of Rhea, see Korybantes.

In Greek mythology and epic literature, the Curetes were legendary people who took part in the quarrel over the Calydonian boar. Strabo mentioned that the Curetes were assigned multiple identities and places of origin (i.e. either Acarnanians, Aetolians, from Crete, or from Euboea). However, he clarified the identity of the Curetes and regarded them solely as Aetolians. Dionysius of Halicarnassus mentioned the Curetes as the old name of the Aetolians.

References

Sources

Ancient Greeks
Iliad
Legendary tribes in Greco-Roman historiography